This is the discography of Thomas J. Bergersen, a composer whose music has been used in trailers of Hollywood blockbusters such as Harry Potter and the Order of the Phoenix, Harry Potter and the Deathly Hallows – Part 1, Harry Potter and the Deathly Hallows – Part 2, Star Trek, Star Trek Into Darkness, Interstellar and many others.

Discography

Volume 1

Shadows and Nightmares

Dynasty

All Drums Go To Hell

Nemesis

Pathogen

Dreams & Imaginations

Legend

Ashes

The Devil Wears Nada

Power of Darkness

Invincible

The Human Experience (Music from the Motion Picture)

Illumina

Illusions

Archangel

Nero

Two Steps From Heaven (Heaven Anthology)

SkyWorld

Burn

Classics Volume One

Miracles

Colin Frake on Fire Mountain

Open Conspiracy

Amaria

Sun

Battlecry

Classics Volume Two

Vanquish

Unleashed

American Dream

Dragon

Seven

Neon Nights

Daybreak

Humanity

Humanity is a ongoing series of seven albums created by Norwegian composer Thomas J. Bergersen, of Two Steps from Hell fame; his third through ninth solo studio albums, described as an "evolution" of the preceding Illusions (2011) and Sun (2014). 

The seven "chapters" each relate musically to a different theme regarding the "ranges of human emotion and history". Bergersen began work on the series in 2014. After six years of development, the first chapter was released in July 2020. The subsequent albums have been released in intervals of several months. Four of the seven chapters have been released as of September 2021, totalling 52 tracks.

The series artwork was designed by Sam Hayles.

Chapter I

The first album, Chapter I, was released on 1 July 2020. Its theme is freedom.

Track listing

Chapter II

The second album, Chapter II, was released on 11 November 2020. Its theme is purpose.

Track listing

Chapter III

The third album, Chapter III, was released on 6 May 2021. Its theme is love.

Track listing

Chapter IV

The fourth album, Chapter IV, was released on 2 September 2021. Its theme is Planet Earth.

Track listing

Songs for Ukraine EP

Between the release of chapters IV and V, Bergersen released an additional three songs in March 2022. Composed in reaction to the 2022 Russian invasion of Ukraine, the EP, entitled Songs for Ukraine, was released as part of the Humanity series but not as part of the main body of work, rather as an addendum. All proceeds from the sales were donated to UNICEF.

Track listing

Chapter V

Future release. Details TBA.

Chapter VI

Future release. Details TBA.

Chapter VII

Future release. Details TBA.

Critical reception
IFMCA-associated reviews website, MundoBSO, rated chapters I and II seven out of ten stars each.

Charts

Standalone tracks 
Songs that did not initially appear on any album release and are available as either commercial singles or as free downloads.
Remember September (2007) — A trance-genre single released with Norwegian EDM artist Boom Jinx. Later reworked for the Two Steps from Hell track Forgotten September.
Where Are You (2011) — Pop-trance with a unique style. Lyrics performed by Thomas Bergersen.
Hymn to Life (2012) — A track released on the occasion of Thomas's birthday. Later performed in a Czech concert as "Hymnus Vitae Dedicatus."
The Hero in Your Heart (2013) — A single made to raise money to help the victims of the Typhoon Haiyan in the Philippines. Lyrics written and performed by Merethe Soltvedt.
That's A Wrap (2014) — A dark, adventurous orchestral ten-minute song created entirely with Thomas's proprietary sample library.
Autumn Love (2014) — An emotional, piano-driven track in a similar style to Dreams and Imaginations.
Into Darkness (2014) — A nine-minute mix of neo-orchestral and EDM club style. Lyrics performed by Thomas Bergersen.
Children of the Sun (2015) — Original vocal version of "None Shall Live" from the Battlecry album. Lyrics performed by Merethe Soltvedt.
You Are Light (2018) — A new ethereal 5-minute track featuring the vocals of Felicia Farerre.
 Imagine (2018) — A new song by Thomas Bergersen.
 In Orbit (2018) — A new epic rock song by Thomas Bergersen featuring the vocals of Cinda M. Later reworked into Orbital in Humanity - Chapter I. 
 Brightest Smile (2018) — Another ethereal composition by Thomas Bergersen featuring the vocals of Natalie Major.
 Catch Me (2019) — A 7-minute epic pop composition by Thomas Bergersen featuring the vocals of Sonna.
 Next to You (2019) — A 3-minute uplifting track by Thomas Bergersen featuring once again the vocals of Sonna.
 One Million Voices (2019) — A 9-minute track by Thomas Bergersen. Later released in Humanity - Chapter IV.
Little Star (2019) — A track released during the holiday season. Thomas says he wrote this song "to commemorate those who were dear to us who have since passed, but whose spirits live on in our memory". Lyrics performed by Audrey Karrasch. This track was later included in Humanity - Chapter III.
So Small (2020) — Later included in Humanity - Chapter IV.
Wings for Ukraine (2022) — Emotional choral-driven work released to showcase support for Ukraine during the 2022 Russian invasion. Released as a single under the Humanity label.

Notes

References

External links 
 
 

Discographies of Norwegian artists